Re Chase [1989] 1 NZLR 325 is a cited case regarding civil claims being barred by ACC.

Background
Paul Chase was a patched member of the Petone Mongrel Mob, and he was with a fellow gang member who were accused of discharging a firearm inside a Lower Hutt tavern frequented by a rival gang.

As the result of Chase being implicated in a gang related shooting, the police arranged a dawn entry into his apartment by armed police on 18 April 1983.

Being startled, Chase thought a rival gang was trying to break into his house, and to defend himself, he approached the police with a weight bar, which the armed officers mistook for a gun barrel and shot him dead.

Barred by ACC law in suing for damages, his estate sued for exemplary damages.

Held
The court refused to award damages

References

Court of Appeal of New Zealand cases
New Zealand tort case law
1988 in New Zealand law